Daniele Dall'Oste (born 24 May 1991 in Varese) is an Italian cyclist.

Palmares
2012
1st Giro del Belvedere
1st Prologue Giro della Valle d'Aosta
2nd Trofeo Città di San Vendemiano
3rd Gran Premio Palio del Recioto
2013
2nd Overall Giro del Friuli Venezia Giulia
3rd Gran Premio di Poggiana

References

1991 births
Living people
Italian male cyclists
Cyclists from Varese